Katrina Lenk (born November 26, 1974) is an American actress, singer, dancer, musician, and songwriter.

Lenk originated the role of Dina in the Broadway musical The Band's Visit, a performance for which she won the 2018 Tony Award for Best Actress in a Musical. She also performed the lead role of Bobbie in the 2021 gender-swapped revival of Stephen Sondheim's musical Company. Lenk's additional stage credits include roles in the Broadway productions of Spider-Man: Turn Off the Dark, Once, and Indecent, as well as roles in regional theater productions.

Early life and education 
Lenk was born in Chicago, Illinois to a family of Eastern European descent. She attended Barrington High School in Barrington, Illinois. She graduated from the School of Music at Northwestern University in 1997, majoring in viola performance and studying voice and musical theatre.

Career
Lenk appeared as Yitzak in Hedwig and the Angry Inch at the Broadway Theatre, Chicago, in May 2001. She performed as Linda Lovelace in the musical Lovelace: A Rock Musical in 2008 at the Hayworth Theatre, Los Angeles, about which the L. A. Weekly wrote: "As Linda, Katrina Lenk is sensational—she has a dozen nuanced smiles that range from innocent and shattered to grateful, in order to express whatever passes as kindness when, say, a male co-star (Josh Greene) promises to make their scene fun."

She made her Broadway debut in The Miracle Worker in March 2010 as the understudy for the roles of Annie Sullivan and Kate Keller. She joined the cast of the Broadway musical Once in May 2013, in the role of Réza, the violinist.

In 2015 she appeared in the Yale Repertory Theatre world premiere of Indecent by Paula Vogel. She then appeared in the 2016 Off-Broadway production at the Vineyard Theatre, followed by the Broadway production at the Cort Theatre in 2017. In her review for Newsday, Linda Winer noted the "...dancing, singing actors as the earthy, sensual Katrina Lenk." For her performance she received the 2017 Theatre World Award Dorothy Loudon Award for Excellence. A performance of the play was filmed for television and broadcast on PBS in November 2017.

Lenk appeared on Broadway as Dina in the 2017 musical The Band's Visit, for which she won the 2018 Tony Award for Best Actress in a Musical. Craig Nakano of the Los Angeles Times wrote: "For Lenk, the role is another turning point. After studying music and theater at Northwestern University, Lenk devoted herself to theater in California.... it’s her poignant, heart-aching turn as Dina that is poised to make her a star."

She is the creator of musical persona and stage act Moxy Phinx.

Lenk starred in the lead role of Bobbie, opposite Patti LuPone as Joanne, in a gender-swapped revival of Stephen Sondheim's Company, which started previews on Broadway at the Bernard B. Jacobs Theatre on March 2 and was scheduled to open on March 22, 2020, until delayed by the COVID-19 pandemic. The production resumed previews on November 15, 2021, for an opening date of December 9, 2021. Lenk also appeared in the final season of Ozark, playing the role of Clare.

Personal life 
She has been in a relationship with actor Andrew Rothenberg since 2012.

Theatre

Filmography

Film

Television

Awards and nominations

References

External links
 
 
 
 
 
  Moxy Phinx

Living people
21st-century American actresses
21st-century American women musicians
21st-century American women singers
American women songwriters
American musical theatre actresses
American stage actresses
American women screenwriters
Actresses from Chicago
Northwestern University alumni
Theatre World Award winners
Grammy Award winners
Tony Award winners
21st-century American singers
1974 births